As Hortas is a settlement in the northwestern part of the island of Fogo, Cape Verde. It is situated 2 km west of Curral Grande, 3 km southwest of Ponta Verde and 8 km north of the island capital São Filipe.

References 

Villages and settlements in Fogo, Cape Verde
São Filipe, Cape Verde